Modern antique (an apparent oxymoron) can have various meanings. Since customs laws and dealers often stipulate an age of at least a hundred years for any item to be legitimately called an antique, the term is sometimes used to describe a collector's item that is technologically obsolete; for example, an older computer or retro toy.

This term is also used to describe new objects designed to appear much older than they are, as with reproductions of old devices and furniture with a distressed (lightly damaged or artificially worn) finish.

More rarely, modern antique may refer to an item from the modern era which is also old enough to qualify for the simple description antique.

Antiques
Furniture
Replicas